The 2022 Giro d'Italia was the 105th edition of the Giro d'Italia, one of cycling's Grand Tours. The Giro began in Budapest on 6 May, and Stage 11 occurred on 18 May with a stage to Reggio Emilia. The race finished in Verona on 29 May.

Classification standings

Stage 1 
6 May 2022 — Budapest (Hungary) to Visegrád (Hungary), 

The first stage of the Giro featured an almost entirely flat parcours with a kick at the end. The first  were mostly flat while the final  featured a steady uphill climb to the finish at Visegrád. The first  of the climb averaged 2.6 per cent before kicking up to 5.1 per cent over the rest of the climb. The riders passed through the first intermediate sprint after , with the sprint offering points for the points classification. The last intermediate sprint took place after , with the sprint offering bonus seconds of 3, 2, and 1 to the first three riders across.

After the riders passed through the neutralised zone, two riders from  immediately jumped from the peloton as Mattia Bais and Filippo Tagliani comprised the day's breakaway. After the duo up front took maximum points at the first intermediate sprint, the sprinters fought for the remaining points, with Giacomo Nizzolo taking third place. At the intermediate sprint for bonus seconds, the  pair took the first two places before Thomas De Gendt took the last bonus second. With  left, the pair up front was finally swept up by the peloton.

The battle for positions ahead of the final climb soon began after the break was caught. With  to go, as the pace increased, a crash took down Harm Vanhoucke, Jan Tratnik, and Erik Fetter; the three would eventually get back up. With  remaining, Lennard Kämna accelerated from the peloton, immediately going past Naesen and building a lead of around 9 seconds.  led the chase, with the peloton eventually catching Kämna inside the final kilometre. Once the catch was made, Davide Formolo attacked but he was unable to build a significant gap. A sprint for the stage win ensued, with Mathieu van der Poel, Biniam Girmay, and Caleb Ewan the main challengers for the win. After Van der Poel went past Girmay, Ewan's front wheel touched Girmay's back wheel, causing the Australian to go down; he would get back up and finish over a minute down. Van der Poel kept himself ahead of Girmay to take the stage win and the first maglia rosa. Pello Bilbao took third while Richard Carapaz and Wilco Kelderman also finished in the lead group, taking four seconds from some of the main GC contenders. With his win, Van der Poel also took the maglia ciclamino and the maglia azzurra as leader of the points and mountains classification, respectively, while Girmay took the white jersey as the best young rider.

Stage 2 
7 May 2022 — Budapest (Hungary),  (ITT)

The first  were mostly flat but the final  featured a fourth-category climb to the finish, with the stage's only intermediate time check located just before it. The first  of the climb had a steep 14 per cent section before having a false flat uphill section inside the final kilometre.

As is customary for time trial stages, the riders set off in reverse order of their general classification placings. As a result, Harm Vanhoucke was the first rider off the start ramp. The first rider to set the benchmark time was Alex Dowsett, who set a time of 12' 23". He sat on the hot seat for a time until Jos van Emden went four seconds quicker with a time of 12' 19". His time was quickly beaten by his teammate, Edoardo Affini, who finished with a time of 12' 10". His time stood for a while until Lennard Kämna managed to beat Affini's time by three seconds. Some riders came close to beating his time before the Italian national time trial champion, Matteo Sobrero, went on to set the provisional fastest time of 12' 03". Only three other riders would go on to beat Sobrero's time. The first was Tom Dumoulin, who went on to set a time of 11' 55", the first time under 12 minutes. His time was quickly beaten by Simon Yates, who set the fastest time at the time check before finishing with a time of 11' 50". No one would threaten his time until the last rider off the start ramp, Mathieu van der Poel, the race leader. Van der Poel was less than a second behind Yates at the time check but he fell short by three seconds at the finish, giving Yates the stage win. In the battle amongst the potential GC contenders, Yates delivered early blows with his stage win as, apart from Dumoulin only losing five seconds, the rest of the potential contenders lost 17 seconds or more. By finishing second, Van der Poel kept the maglia rosa, the maglia ciclamino, and the maglia azzurra while Sobrero took the white jersey as the best young rider.

Stage 3 
8 May 2022 — Kaposvár (Hungary) to Balatonfüred (Hungary), 

The third stage of the Giro featured the first chance for the pure sprinters to take a win in the race as the riders tackled a  flat course from Kaposvár to Balatonfüred. There was only one categorised climb on the route, with the riders tackling the fourth-category climb to Tihany which was crested with  left. The intermediate sprint for points took place after  while the intermediate sprint for bonus seconds took place with  left.

The trio built an advantage of around seven minutes before  took station at the front of the peloton to bring the break back. With  to go, Jan Tratnik became the first rider to abandon the race as a result of the injuries he sustained after crashing in stage one. After the three breakaway riders took maximum points at the first intermediate sprint, Fernando Gaviria won the sprint for the remaining maximum points. Halfway through the stage,  and  began to send riders to the front of the peloton to contribute to the chase. With  to go, Rivi accelerated from the break, dropping Tagliani in the process while at this point, the peloton was only around less than a minute behind. Rivi and Bais continued to hover at around less than a minute ahead of the peloton until they were brought back with  left.

After the breakaway riders were caught, the teams of the GC riders and the sprinters went to the front to protect their riders.  from the finish, Pascal Eenkhoorn and Rick Zabel escaped from the peloton to battle for the KOM points, which was won by Eenkhoorn. Zabel, meanwhile, took the lead in the mountains classification with the points he gained. Eenkhoorn continued with his move as Zabel dropped back to the peloton, with the lone escapee getting caught with  remaining. The peloton soon headed towards the inevitable bunch sprint. In the sprint, Caleb Ewan was caught out of position while Mark Cavendish, Arnaud Démare, Biniam Girmay, and Gaviria were put in the best position towards the finish. Cavendish held off Démare and Gaviria to win the stage, his 16th Giro stage win. All the main GC contenders finished safely in the peloton. Mathieu van der Poel kept the maglia rosa as there were no changes in the top ten ahead of the race's first rest day.

Rest day 1 
9 May 2022 — Avola

Stage 4 
10 May 2022 — Avola to Etna (Rif. Sapienza), 

Following the rest day, the riders arrived in Sicily for the first mountain stage of the race and the first major test for the GC contenders. On this occasion, the riders finished atop Etna for the fourth time in the last six editions of the race, with the riders going up Rifugio Sapienza. The first  of the stage featured a hilly section that presented an opportunity for the breakaway to form. Following a descent and a long flat section, the riders headed uphill towards Mount Etna. Just before the climb, the intermediate sprint for points took place with  left while the intermediate sprint for bonus seconds took place with  remaining. The steepest sections of the climb were in the middle, with a  section averaging approximately 7.4 per cent. Following this section, the climb averaged 5.4 per cent before the road flattened inside the final kilometre.

As the stage officially started, the fight for the breakaway was furious, with multiple riders wanting to go into the break. While the fight for the break was ongoing, two crashes took place; among those involved was Simon Yates but no one was seriously injured. As the road started to go uphill, 13 riders jumped from the peloton, with Lilian Calmejane and Simone Ravanelli attempting to bridge to the leading group; Calmejane would eventually make it to the break while Ravanelli drifted back to the peloton. The best placed GC rider in the break was Mauri Vansevenant, who sat 43 seconds behind the race leader, Mathieu van der Poel. The peloton allowed the break to gain 11 minutes of an advantage before  and  began to control the gap. As the riders rode through the initial uncategorised climb, news broke through that Miguel Ángel López abandoned the race after suffering from a left hip injury. The peloton continued to keep the break in check but towards the climb, the break still had a lead of around six minutes. With  to go, Stefano Oldani attacked from the break, immediately building a gap over the rest of the breakaway riders. Oldani won both intermediate sprints while Vansevenant took two seconds at the second intermediate sprint to add to his virtual GC lead.

At the foot of the final climb, the rest of the breakaway group began to split, with six riders remaining in the chase group while Oldani held a lead of almost a minute. Oldani was soon passed by the chase group, which contained three riders: Lennard Kämna, Sylvain Moniquet, and Vansevenant.  from the finish, Kämna went off in pursuit of López, who was around half a minute ahead. He would catch the solo leader with  left, setting up a two-man sprint for the finish. In the final corner, López misjudged the apex, with Kämna building a small gap to take the stage win. Third place on the stage went to Rein Taaramäe, who was dropped from the chase group but gauged his efforts well to finish only half a minute down. In the peloton, a group of 17 riders containing most of the main contenders finished two and a half minutes down as the headwind dissuaded attacks on the climb. Some notable contenders saw their GC hopes dashed on the climb. Vincenzo Nibali, the team's leader after López's withdrawal, lost more than two minutes, while Tobias Foss also finished in the same group as the Italian. Foss's teammate, Tom Dumoulin, lost seven minutes.

Despite losing the sprint for the stage win, López took over the maglia rosa as van der Poel was dropped early on the climb while Vansevenant ended up losing two minutes. He also took the white jersey as the best young rider. Kämna took over the maglia azzurra after going first over Mount Etna.

Stage 5 
11 May 2022 — Catania to Messina, 

The fifth stage of the Giro featured a  course that took the riders from Catania to Messina. The first  were mostly flat before the road started to go uphill with the second-category climb of Portella Mandrazzi. Following the descent, the road was flat all the way to the finish.

It took a few kilometres following the stage's official start before a group of five riders escaped from the peloton. The break contained Jaakko Hänninen, Alessandro Tonelli, Mirco Maestri, and the  pair of Mattia Bais and Filippo Tagliani. The quintet took a lead of around four minutes before the sprinters' teams began to control the gap. At the intermediate sprint for points, the break took the maximum points while in the peloton, Biniam Girmay took the remaining points to close in on the leader of the maglia ciclamino, Mathieu van der Poel. As the riders approached the climb, the peloton initially went on a steady pace before  began to increase the pace on the climb. Caleb Ewan got distanced after suffering an untimely mechanical, while Mark Cavendish was soon dropped from the peloton. Towards the top, Arnaud Démare was also distanced by the pace. At the top of the climb, the peloton was less than a minute down on the break, with the Démare group around a further minute behind the peloton. Meanwhile, the Cavendish group was more than two minutes down and Ewan's group was four minutes down. 

Following the descent, Démare's group managed to catch the peloton, while the breakaway group had already been reeled in with  remaining. With Cavendish's and Ewan's groups unable to make inroads to the peloton's lead, they would eventually give up on chasing the peloton. At the intermediate sprint for bonus seconds, João Almeida attempted to take some seconds. He eventually took two seconds as Ben Swift snatched the three bonus seconds. For the rest of the stage, the remaining sprinters' teams prepared for the bunch sprint while the teams of the GC contenders kept their leaders safe. In the final sprint,  managed to deliver Démare to the perfect position. Démare held off Fernando Gaviria to win his first Grand Tour stage in two years. Giacomo Nizzolo ended up finishing third. With his win, Démare also took the maglia ciclamino. Apart from Almeida taking two bonus seconds and moving up to seventh on GC, there were no other changes in the top ten.

Stage 6 
12 May 2022 — Palmi to Scalea (Riviera dei Cedri), 

The sixth stage took the riders from Palmi to Scalea with a stage for the pure sprinters. After , the riders travelled through an uncategorised climb before reaching the fourth-category climb to Aeroporto L. Razza, a  climb with an average gradient of 3.7 per cent. Following the descent, the rest of the stage was mostly flat, apart from a few small lumps on the way to the finish. The intermediate sprint for points took place after  while the intermediate sprint for bonus seconds took place with  left.

After the stage's official start, there were a few attempts by riders to go into the break, but the riders did not go full gas in their attempts. He took a lead of around five and a half minutes before the sprinters' teams began to stabilise the gap.  from the finish, the  trio of Eduardo Sepúlveda, Filippo Tagliani, and Simone Ravanelli attacked from the peloton. At the intermediate sprint for points, the breakaway riders took maximum points while Biniam Girmay outsprinted Arnaud Démare for the maglia ciclamino. With  to go, Sepúlveda, Tagliani, and Ravanelli were swept up by the peloton as the three were unable to bridge up to Rosa. For the rest of the day, the peloton rode at a steady pace while slowly decreasing Rosa's gap. At the intermediate sprint for bonus seconds, there was a slight action in the peloton as Tagliani crossed the sprint in second to increase his lead in the intermediate sprints classification while Lennard Kämna, second in the GC, took one second to close in on the lead of Juan Pedro López. With  remaining, Rosa was finally caught by the peloton. The peloton soon headed towards the inevitable bunch sprint, with the sprinters' teams preparing their trains and the GC teams protecting their leaders. At the finish, Mark Cavendish was the first to launch his sprint. Caleb Ewan came around him but Démare was coming out of the Australian's slipstream. Démare managed to pip Ewan at the line with a bike throw to win his second consecutive stage. Cavendish held on for third while Girmay finished fourth. With his win, Démare further extended his lead for the maglia ciclamino. Apart from Kämna taking one bonus second, there were no changes in the top ten of the GC.

Stage 7 
13 May 2022 — Diamante to Potenza, 

The seventh stage was a  hilly course that took the riders from Diamante to Potenza. After a short flat section and few small lumps, the riders reached the foot of the second-category Passo Colla, a  climb with an average gradient of 4.5 per cent. Following the descent, the riders tackled the longest climb of the day, the first-category Monte Sirino. After the descent, the riders tackled an uncategorised climb on the way to the intermediate sprint for points at Viggiano with  left. The short descent immediately led to the foot of the second-category Mont. Grande di Viggiano, a  climb with an average gradient of 9.1 per cent. The climb was crested with  remaining. A short descent led to the finish at Potenza, where the last climb of  had an average gradient of 8 per cent, with a maximum gradient of 13 per cent.

Multiple attacks marked the start of the stage as several riders attempted to make it into the breakaway. Over the first part of the stage, different groups of riders tried to make it into the break before being swept up by the peloton. On the first climb, the Passo Colla, Wout Poels eventually managed to build a gap and took maximum points for the KOM classification. On the descent, Davide Formolo and Anthony Perez managed to bridge up to Poels before a group of nine riders also made it to the front group. A little bit later, Richard Carapaz made a surprise attack together with his teammate, Jhonatan Narváez, and Mathieu van der Poel. They made it to the lead group to make it 15 out front before Formolo and Jorge Arcas attacked out of the leading group. The group of 13 chasers, including Carapaz, were eventually caught by the peloton, while out front, Formolo began to distance Arcas. With the gap still close, Davide Villella attacked from the peloton to join Formolo. They were soon joined by Koen Bouwman and Poels on the climb of Monte Sirino. A bit further later, Bauke Mollema, Diego Camargo, and Bouwman's teammate, Tom Dumoulin, also made it to the front to make it a seven-man group, with the peloton content to let them go. 

The group increased their lead to as much as five and a half minutes before  controlled the gap as Bouwman was only 5' 30" down on the GC leader, Juan Pedro López. At the top of Monte Sirino, Bouwman sprinted to take the maximum KOM points. On the approach to the climb of Mont. Grande di Viggiano, Villella went down in a crash before getting back up, while Poels was distanced on the climb itself. At the top, Bouwman once again took maximum KOM points to take the virtual lead in the mountains classification. With around  left, Villella made it back to the front group. On the climb of La Sellata, Villella and Camargo were unable to follow the pace while Dumoulin, Mollema, and Formolo took turns attacking on the climb. At one point, Bouwman was distanced but he made it back at the top of the climb, also taking the maximum KOM points in the process. At the final uncategorised climb, Mollema and Formolo made separate attacks, with Dumoulin getting dropped in the process. Dumoulin eventually made it back to the front with  left, setting up a sprint for the stage win. He would not get passed as he took his first Grand Tour stage win. Mollema took second, with Formolo taking third. Aside from his win, Bouwman also took the maglia azzurra. 

In the GC group, there were no attacks, with  setting a steady pace. On the uphill finish, a sprint ensued but there were no gaps in the group, which finished almost three minutes down. As a result, López kept the maglia rosa as there were no changes in the top ten of the GC.

Stage 8 
14 May 2022 — Naples to Naples (Procida Capitale Italiana della Cultura), 

The eighth stage took the riders on a circuit that started and ended in Naples, with a parcours that included several short climbs. The first few kilometers featured two uncategorised hills before the riders reached the intermediate sprint for points after . Upon reaching Bacoli after  of racing, the riders faced four laps of a circuit that featured the climb of Monte di Procida and another short climb to Lago Lucrino. The last passage of Monte di Procida is categorised as a fourth-category climb. The intermediate sprint for bonus seconds is located at Bacoli with  remaining before the riders leave the circuit following the fourth passage to Lago Lucrino with  left. The riders faced two more uncategorised climbs before finishing in Naples.

The first few kilometers of the stage saw a group of 21 riders roll off the front to establish the breakaway. The break included riders such as Mathieu van der Poel, Biniam Girmay, Diego Ulissi, Thomas De Gendt, and Wout Poels while the best-placed GC rider in the break was Guillaume Martin, only 4' 06" down on the race leader, Juan Pedro López. After  of racing, van der Poel attempted to solo off the front, but he was eventually caught by the 20 chasers. At one point,  attempted to chase down the break but they were unable to bring it back. Eventually, Martin's presence in the break prompted  to control the break's advantage, which was two and a half minutes at its maximum. At the intermediate sprint for points, Girmay took maximum points to decrease Arnaud Démare's lead in the points classification to 41. With  to go, Jasha Sütterlin dropped back from the break to make it 20 out front.  from the finish, van der Poel accelerated out of the break once again, but he was eventually caught. As a result of his attack, the breakaway group began to split.

With  left, Davide Gabburo attacked out of the break. Only the  pair of Harm Vanhoucke and De Gendt, Jorge Arcas, and Simone Ravanelli were able to bridge up to him to establish the front group, although Ravanelli would soon drop back to the chasers. They quickly built their lead to around 20 seconds over the chase group. The front group continued to work well together to maintain and extend their gap over the chasers. On the final passage of the climb to Lago Lucrino, attacks from the chasers split the group further, leaving Mauro Schmid, van der Poel, Girmay, Martin, and Poels as the five riders left in the chase group. The front group’s lead went to as high as 40 seconds before the gap began to come down once again. Inside the final , with the gap to the front group down to less than 20 seconds, van der Poel and Girmay accelerated out of the chase group, while Schmid soon tried to bridge up to the pair. The leaders’ gap came down to around eight seconds, but they had enough to contest the stage win. In the sprint, Vanhoucke led out the group for his teammate, De Gendt. De Gendt came out of his slipstream and held off Gabburo and Arcas to win the stage. In the chasing group, Schmid bridged up to van der Poel and Girmay but the Eritrean won the sprint for fifth. Poels and Martin finished 33 seconds down.

In the GC group,  continued to lead the peloton. On the final uncategorised climb, Lennard Kämna tried to attack López but the race leader was able to mark his move. The peloton finished at three and a half minutes down, which meant that Martin rose up to fourth on GC at around a minute down.

Stage 9 
15 May 2022 — Isernia to Blockhaus, 

The last stage before the second rest day featured the second summit finish of the race with the riders finishing atop the climb of Blockhaus. The climb was last used in 2017, when Nairo Quintana soloed to the stage win. From the get-go, the riders climbed the third-category Valico del Macerone, the second-category Rionero Sannitico, and the second-category Roccaraso, all in quick succession in the first . For the next , the riders faced an undulating course, with the riders reaching the intermediate sprint for points at Filetto with  left.  from the finish, the riders started the first-category climb of Passo Lanciano, a  climb with an average gradient of 7.6 per cent. Following the descent, the riders tackled an uncategorised climb to the intermediate sprint for bonus seconds with  remaining, right at the foot of the first-category climb of Blockhaus. The last  of the climb averaged 9.4 per cent.

The start of the stage featured attempts by several riders to go up the road. At one point, the likes of the maglia azzurra wearer Koen Bouwman and Mathieu van der Poel tried to go into the break but they were unable to escape. Eventually, Diego Rosa flew off the front on the climb of Rionero Sannitico, with Joe Dombrowski and Natnael Tesfatsion chasing him a few seconds down. A group of six chasers also formed on the climb, consisting of the  duo of Nans Peters and Felix Gall, Filippo Zana, Eduardo Sepúlveda, Jonathan Caicedo, and James Knox. On the climb, a crash involving some riders, including Pello Bilbao, took place but all riders would get back up. On the descent, the nine riders up the road would join together to form the break of the day. The break increased their lead to four and a half minutes before  began to stabilise the gap. Their advantage grew to as much as five and a half minutes before Jonathan Castroviejo started to eat into their lead.

There were some attacks in the chasing group but only Sepúlveda was able to bridge up to Peters and Tesfatsion. On the climb of Passo Lanciano, Rosa was able to make it to the front group to make it a quartet.  from the finish, Rosa attacked the front group and only Tesfatsion was able to go with him. Meanwhile, the chase group split, with some riders getting swept up by the peloton. On the descent, Tesfatsion went off road before crashing, but he was able to get back on his bike. Another rider who crashed on the descent was Mikel Landa though he was not seriously injured. Wilco Kelderman also suffered a mechanical on the descent, which ended up being crucial as he lost 10 minutes on the stage. On the uncategorised climb before Blockhaus, Peters and Dombrowski managed to bridge to Rosa but at this point, the peloton was only less than a minute behind. Dombrowski was the last surviving member of the break but he was swept up with  left.

On the climb,  and Rui Costa set the pace early on. With  remaining, Giulio Ciccone was the first contender to be distanced, followed soon after by Simon Yates, who was suffering from knee pain due to his crash on stage four. Hugh Carthy also could not keep up, losing almost four minutes by the end. With around  left, after a touch of wheels, the race leader, Juan Pedro López unclipped his pedals, causing him to lose contact with the lead group, which continued to thin out.  from the finish, Richard Carapaz was the first contender to make his move. Romain Bardet and Landa were the only ones able to follow his move. Meanwhile, a chase group formed, consisting of João Almeida, Jai Hindley, Vincenzo Nibali, Domenico Pozzovivo, and Alejandro Valverde. Towards the top, Valverde and Nibali lost contact with the chase group while Almeida slowly brought back the three leaders. After Almeida, Hindley, and Pozzovivo bridged up to the lead group, Pozzovivo and Bardet made separate attacks. Bardet's move was joined by Carapaz and Landa but the other three chasers would slowly come back inside the final kilometer to set up a six-man sprint for the win. In the sprint, Hindley held off Bardet and Carapaz to take the stage win. Landa and Almeida took fourth and fifth, respectively, at the same time as Hindley. Meanwhile, López finished 1' 46" down, which was just enough to keep the maglia rosa.

In the GC, Almeida, Bardet, Carapaz, and Hindley moved inside the top five, within 20 seconds of López. Guillaume Martin sits at sixth, 28 seconds down, while Landa is behind him by a second. Pozzovivo is the only other rider within a minute of López's maglia rosa, 54 seconds down. Meanwhile, Rosa took the maglia azzurra with the KOM points he gained on the stage.

Rest day 2 
16 May 2022 — Pescara

Stage 10 
17 May 2022 — Pescara to Jesi, 

The first stage after the second rest day took the riders from Pescara to Jesi with a stage that featured an undulating final part. The first half of the stage was pan flat until the riders reached the intermediate sprint for points with  remaining. The intermediate sprint for bonus seconds was located at Filottrano with  left.

A few kilometres following the stage's official start, Lawrence Naesen and Mattia Bais went off the front of the peloton, with Alessandro De Marchi joining the two shortly afterwards. The peloton allowed the trio to build a maximum advantage of around six and a half minutes before  and  began to take control at the front of the peloton. At one point during the stage, ' GC leader, Richard Carapaz, was involved in a minor crash but he was not seriously injured. At the intermediate sprint for points, the break took maximum points while in the peloton, the maglia ciclamino wearer, Arnaud Démare, took fourth to extend his lead in the points classification. During the undulating second part of the course, Caleb Ewan and Mark Cavendish were dropped by the peloton. With  remaining, David de la Cruz attacked from the peloton but he was quickly caught. Around  from the finish, Mathieu van der Poel had a mechanical before eventually coming back to the peloton.

With  left, action took place in the peloton as Juul-Jensen made another attack, this time being marked by Dries De Bondt and Lorenzo Rota before they were reeled back in. At the same time, at the front, De Marchi left Naesen and Bais behind on one of the uncategorised hills. He would eventually be caught with  left. On the final categorised climb to Monsano,  set a furious pace in an attempt to drop some contenders. The pace dropped pure sprinters such as Démare, Fernando Gaviria, and Giacomo Nizzolo. The finale of the stage was marked by several attacks by riders who wanted to avoid a sprint. Alessandro Covi and Vincenzo Nibali made separate attacks but they were quickly brought back. Van der Poel also attempted a solo attack but he was brought back. Carapaz and Hugh Carthy also attacked at separate times but it all came down to a reduced bunch sprint. Domenico Pozzovivo led it out towards the final, with his teammate, Biniam Girmay, launching a long sprint. Van der Poel tried to come around him but he ran out of gas at the end as Girmay became the first Black African rider to win a Grand Tour stage. All the main GC contenders finished in the lead group as Juan Pedro López kept the maglia rosa.

On the podium, as Girmay was opening the bottle of Prosecco, the cork hit his left eye at full speed. He was checked by race and team doctors before being sent to the hospital for treatment. The following day, Girmay confirmed that he would not start stage 11 in order to let his eye injury fully heal.

Stage 11 
18 May 2022 — Santarcangelo di Romagna to Reggio Emilia, 

The eleventh stage of the Giro took the riders from Santarcangelo di Romagna to Reggio Emilia with a stage that was expected to be for the pure sprinters. The entirety of the stage was pan flat, with no climbs along the way. The intermediate sprint for points took place with  left while the intermediate sprint for bonus seconds took place with  remaining.

As soon as the flag was waved to signal the official start, Filippo Tagliani and Luca Rastelli pulled away off the front to comprise the day's breakaway. They were given an advantage of around five minutes before the sprinters' teams began the chase. At the intermediate sprint for points, the duo up front took maximum points while in the peloton, Mark Cavendish won the sprint for third, just ahead of the maglia ciclamino wearer, Arnaud Démare. At one point, a group containing Caleb Ewan was dropped off the back of the peloton but they eventually managed to make it back. At the intermediate sprint for bonus seconds, Richard Carapaz sprinted to take three bonus seconds. There were attempts throughout the day to split the peloton into echelons, but the wind was not strong enough.

With around  left, Dries De Bondt opened a gap to the peloton. His lead went to over a minute, but the peloton kept him in check. De Bondt was able to keep a lead of around half a minute over the peloton onto the final kilometres before he was eventually swept up with  left. In the final sprint, Fernando Gaviria and Simone Consonni initially emerged as the strongest sprinters until Alberto Dainese went around them to win the stage, his first Grand Tour stage win and the first by an Italian in this Giro. Gaviria took second over Consonni while Démare, Ewan, and Cavendish finished fourth, fifth, and sixth, respectively. Juan Pedro López kept the maglia rosa, with the only change in the top ten being that Carapaz moved up to second with his three bonus seconds, at the same time as João Almeida.

References

External links 

2022 Giro d'Italia
Giro d'Italia stages